Alabama's at-large congressional district was a congressional district for the United States House of Representatives in Alabama active at various times from 1819 to 1965.  Alabama became a state in 1819, and its single representative to the 16th and 17th Congresses was elected at-large.  For the 27th Congress, all five of Alabama's representatives were elected at-large, before the state gained a representative from the 1840 census.  In the 43rd to 44th Congresses, the seventh and eighth representatives gained in the 1870 census were elected at-large.  For the 63rd and 64th Congresses, Alabama elected the tenth of its apportioned representatives, gained in the 1910 census, at-large from the entire state.  For the 88th Congress, after the state lost one representative in the 1960 census, Alabama once again elected all of their representatives at-large.

List of members representing the district

References

 Congressional Biographical Directory of the United States 1774–present

At-large
Former congressional districts of the United States
At-large United States congressional districts
Constituencies established in 1819
Constituencies disestablished in 1823
1819 establishments in Alabama
1823 disestablishments in Alabama
Constituencies established in 1841
Constituencies disestablished in 1843
1841 establishments in Alabama
1843 disestablishments in Alabama
Constituencies established in 1873
Constituencies disestablished in 1877
1873 establishments in Alabama
1877 disestablishments in Alabama
Constituencies established in 1913
Constituencies disestablished in 1917
1913 establishments in Alabama
1917 disestablishments in Alabama
Constituencies established in 1963
Constituencies disestablished in 1965
1963 establishments in Alabama
1965 disestablishments in Alabama